Karl Anthony (born March 14, 1967) is an American former professional football player who was a defensive back in the Canadian Football League (CFL). He was a CFL All-Star with the Calgary Stampeders in 1993. He won a Grey Cup championship with the Baltimore Stallions in 1995 and was named the Grey Cup Most Valuable Player (MVP) in 1994.

Career
Anthony played his college football at Southwest Missouri State University and first played professionally for three years with the Calgary Stampeders, where he was an all-star in 1993. In 1994, he moved to the Baltimore Stallions he won the Grey Cup's Most Valuable Player in a losing cause against the British Columbia Lions. He helped Baltimore win the Grey Cup in 1995 against his old team, the Calgary Stampeders.

References

1967 births
Living people
Baltimore Stallions players
Canadian football defensive backs
Calgary Stampeders players
Missouri State Bears football players
People from New Iberia, Louisiana